Khulane Morule (born August 27, 1982), better known by his stage name Khuli Chana, is a South African Motswako rapper.

Early life and career
Morule was born in the Mmabatho, North West Province and started rapping motswako at a young age. He was a member of a rap group called Morafe. He then proceeded to go solo, after the rap group took a break from releasing music as a unit.

Khuli Chana rose to fame after releasing his major successful album Motswakoriginator, which infuses both the Setswana and English languages. Motswako is a mixture of both languages and the sound and style of music originates from Mahikeng, a small town in the North West Province.

In 2014, Chana was nominated for Most Valuable Artist and Video of the Year at 2014 South African Hip Hop Awards.

He has shared a stage with US rapper Drake, as an opening act.

Khuli Chana partnered with vodka brand Absolut as one of their ambassadors for the South Africa market.

Khuli Chana was nearly killed when members of the South African police mistook him for a criminal and proceeded to fire nine bullets at his vehicle.

Personal life
In 2013, Khuli was shot by police while in his car due to mistaken identity. This was a major blow to his name and career as there were speculations about the incident. Luckily he survived the shooting, fully recovered and cleared his name. He settled it out of court and got himself R1.8 million. Khuli Chana married DJ and television personality Lamiez Holworthy in 2019.

Discography
Studio albums
 Motswakoriginator (2009)
 Lost in Time (2012)
 One Source (2016)
 Planet of The Have Nots (2018)

References 

1982 births
Living people
People from Mahikeng
South African hip hop musicians
South African rappers